The 2004 Stanley Cup playoffs for the National Hockey League began on April 7, 2004, following the 2003–04 regular season. The playoffs ended with the Tampa Bay Lightning winning the Stanley Cup with a seven-game series win over the Calgary Flames on June 7. It was Tampa Bay's first Stanley Cup championship. These playoffs ended up being the last playoff tournament until 2006 due to the 2004–05 NHL lockout that resulted in the cancellation of the following season. The 16 qualified teams, eight from each conference, played best-of-seven games for Conference Quarterfinals, Semifinals and Finals. The winner of each conference proceeded to the Stanley Cup Finals. The format was identical to the one introduced for the 1999 playoffs.

These playoffs marked the first time the Nashville Predators qualified, being in their sixth season in the NHL. This would be the last time that all eastern Canadian teams would make the playoffs together until 2013. This was the last time until 2019 that both Southern California teams, the Los Angeles Kings and Anaheim Ducks, missed the playoffs.

The Flames tied the 1987 Philadelphia Flyers for the most games played (26) in one playoff year (later matched by the 2014 Los Angeles Kings, 2015 Tampa Bay Lightning, and 2019 St. Louis Blues). The record was subsequently broken by the Dallas Stars during the 2020 Stanley Cup playoffs, albeit due to a change in the playoff format.

Playoff seeds

Eastern Conference
Tampa Bay Lightning, Southeast Division champions, Eastern Conference regular season champions – 106 points
Boston Bruins, Northeast Division champions – 104 points
Philadelphia Flyers, Atlantic Division champions – 101 points
Toronto Maple Leafs – 103 points
Ottawa Senators – 102 points
New Jersey Devils – 100 points
Montreal Canadiens – 93 points
New York Islanders – 91 points

Western Conference
Detroit Red Wings, Central Division champions, Western Conference regular season champions, Presidents' Trophy winners – 109 points
San Jose Sharks, Pacific Division champions – 104 points
Vancouver Canucks, Northwest Division champions – 101 points
Colorado Avalanche – 100 points
Dallas Stars – 97 points
Calgary Flames – 94 points
St. Louis Blues – 91 points (39 wins)
Nashville Predators – 91 points (38 wins)

Playoff bracket

Conference Quarterfinals

Eastern Conference Quarterfinals

(1) Tampa Bay Lightning vs. (8) New York Islanders
The Tampa Bay Lightning entered the playoffs as the Eastern Conference regular season and Southeast Division champions with 106 points. New York qualified as the eighth seed earning 91 points during the regular season. This was the first playoff series between these two teams. The Islanders won three of the four games in this year's regular season series.

Tampa Bay defeated the Islanders in five games. Games one and two saw goaltenders Nikolai Khabibulin of the Lightning and Rick DiPietro of the Islanders trade 3–0 shutouts, with Tampa Bay winning game one and New York winning game two. In games three and four, Khabibulin shut-out the Islanders winning both games by a score of 3–0. In game five, Martin St. Louis scored the game-winner four minutes into overtime.

(2) Boston Bruins vs. (7) Montreal Canadiens

The Boston Bruins entered the playoffs as the Northeast Division champions, earning the second seed in the Eastern Conference with 104 points. Montreal qualified as the seventh seed, earning 93 points during the regular season. This was the thirtieth playoff series between these two rivals, with Montreal winning twenty-two of the twenty-nine previous series. They last met in the 2002 Eastern Conference Quarterfinals, where Montreal won in six games. Boston won the season series earning seven of ten points during this year's five game regular season series.

The Canadiens overcame a 3–1 series deficit to eliminate the Bruins in seven games. In game one, the Bruins won a low scoring game 3–0, behind a 31-save shutout from goaltender Andrew Raycroft. In game two, Raycroft allowed one goal and Boston won the game 2–1. Montreal won game three, 3–2. The Canadiens were pushed to the brink of elimination with a 4–3 double-overtime loss in game four. Montreal won game five by a score of 5–1, scoring three third period goals to break open a close game. Montreal forced a seventh game with a 5–2 victory in game six. Montreal completed the comeback with a 2–0 victory in game seven, as goaltender Jose Theodore shut-out the Bruins making 32 saves.

(3) Philadelphia Flyers vs. (6) New Jersey Devils

The Philadelphia Flyers entered the playoffs as the Atlantic Division champions, earning the third seed in the Eastern Conference with 101 points. New Jersey qualified as the sixth seed earning 100 points during the regular season. This was the fourth playoff meeting between these two teams with New Jersey winning two of the three previous series. They last met in the 2000 Eastern Conference Final where New Jersey won in seven games. Philadelphia won the season series earning seven of twelve points during this year's six game regular season series.

Philadelphia defeated New Jersey in five games. Keith Primeau scored the game-winning goal in game one as the Flyers hung on to win by a score of 3–2. In game two Mark Recchi gave the Flyers the lead on a power-play goal in the first period, the teams traded goals in the final two periods as Philadelphia won again 3–2. New Jersey scored three times on the power-play in game three as they won the game 4–2. Goaltender Robert Esche stopped 35 shots in game four to earn a 3–0 shutout victory for the Flyers. Danny Markov scored the series winning goal at 14:37 of the third period in game five as the Flyers defeated the Devils with a 3–1 victory.

(4) Toronto Maple Leafs vs. (5) Ottawa Senators
The Toronto Maple Leafs entered the playoffs as the fourth seed in the Eastern Conference with 103 points. Ottawa qualified as the fifth seed earning 102 points during the regular season. This was the fourth playoff series in five years between these two teams, and the fourth series overall, Toronto won all three previous meetings. They last met in the 2002 Eastern Conference Semifinals where Toronto won in seven games. Toronto won this year's six game regular season series earning nine of twelve points during the season.

The Maple Leafs eliminated the Senators in seven games. In game one Ottawa scored two power-play goals 38 seconds apart in the second period to pull out a 4–2 victory. The Maple Leafs came through with 2–0 win on the strength of a 31-save shutout by Ed Belfour in game two. Toronto won game three 2–0 as Ed Belfour shutout Ottawa again. Ottawa finally scored late in the first period of game four and they would add three more goals to win the game 4–1. Tie Domi scored the game-winning goal in game five and Ed Belfour posted his third shutout of the series in yet another 2–0 Toronto victory. Ottawa won game six 2–1 in double-overtime as Mike Fisher scored at 1:47. In game seven, Ottawa goaltender Patrick Lalime gave up two goals to Joe Nieuwendyk before being pulled after the first period and replaced by backup Martin Prusek, as Toronto earned a series-clinching 4–1 win. This remains to date the Maple Leafs’ last postseason series win.

Western Conference Quarterfinals

(1) Detroit Red Wings vs. (8) Nashville Predators

The Detroit Red Wings entered the playoffs as the Presidents' Trophy winners, the Western Conference regular season and Central Division champions, with 109 points. Nashville qualified as the eighth seed earning 91 points (losing the tiebreaker to St. Louis by having fewer wins) during the regular season. This was the first playoff meeting between these two teams. The Predators qualified for the playoffs for the first time since entering the league in the 1998–99 season. Nashville won the season series earning seven of twelve points during this year's six game regular season series.

Detroit defeated Nashville in six games. In game one the Red Wings scored three times in the third period and posted a 3–1 victory. Mathieu Schneider scored the game-winning goal late in third period on the power-play in game two. Nashville struck twice in the first period of game three and Tomas Vokoun made 41 saves in the Predators first playoff victory in franchise history. Detroit heavily out-shot Nashville in game four as Predators' goaltender Tomas Vokoun posted a 41 save shutout in a 3–0 Nashville win. In game five, Curtis Joseph started in goal for the Red Wings, and Henrik Zetterberg scored a goal and an assist in the first six minutes of the game as the Red Wings dominated the Predators, winning 4–1. Detroit scored two goals 30 seconds apart in game six and Curtis Joseph posted a shutout as the Red Wings closed out the series with a 2–0 win.

(2) San Jose Sharks vs. (7) St. Louis Blues
San Jose entered the playoffs as the Pacific Division champions, earning the second seed in the Western Conference with 104 points. St. Louis qualified as the seventh seed earning 91 points (winning the tiebreaker over Nashville by having more wins) during the regular season. This was the third playoff series between these two teams; they split the two previous meetings. They last met in the 2001 Western Conference Quarterfinals where St. Louis won in six games. San Jose won this year's four game regular season series earning five of eight points during the season.

San Jose defeated the Blues in five games. Game one saw a defensive battle with San Jose winning the game 1–0, on the strength of a 26-save shutout from Evgeni Nabokov. Chris Osgood was equally strong in net for the Blues, but allowed a goal to Niko Dimitrakos in the first overtime. Nabokov gave up only one goal in game two, a 3–1 Sharks victory highlighted by Patrick Marleau's hat-trick. In game three the Blues used home-ice advantage to post a 4–1 victory getting a hat-trick from Mike Sillinger. The next night, in game four, saw a back-and-forth game that ultimately went to San Jose 4–3. With a chance to knock out the Blues at home in game five the Sharks did just that, winning 3–1.

Shortly after the series, St. Louis left winger Mike Danton, was arrested, charged and convicted in a conspiracy to murder his agent, David Frost. It was later revealed the hitman he hired was meant for his father.

(3) Vancouver Canucks vs. (6) Calgary Flames

The Vancouver Canucks entered the playoffs as the Northwest Division champions, earning the third seed in the Western Conference with 101 points. Calgary qualified as the sixth seed earning 94 points during the regular season. This was the sixth playoff meeting between these two rivals with Calgary winning three of the five previous series, they last met in the 1994 Western Conference Quarterfinals, with the Canucks winning in seven games. The Flames qualified for the playoffs for the first time since 1996. Vancouver won the season series earning seven of twelve points during this year's six game regular season series.

The Flames eliminated the Canucks in seven games and won their first playoff series since winning the Stanley Cup in 1989. Vancouver scored four times on the power-play in game one as they took the opening game 5–3. Calgary scored two goals 50 seconds apart in the first period of game two in a 2–1 victory. In game three Dan Cloutier was injured in the first period and backup Johan Hedberg replaced him, Matt Cooke scored early in the third period as Vancouver won the game 2–1. Calgary goaltender Miikka Kiprusoff recorded a shutout in game four as the Flames won 4–0. In game five Alexander Auld became the third goaltender to play for Vancouver in the series, the Canucks lost the game 2–1. Vancouver stormed out to a 4–0 lead only to see the Flames come back to tie the game in the third period, Brendan Morrison scored 2:28 into the third overtime period in a 5–4 Vancouver victory. Jarome Iginla and Matt Cooke each scored twice in regulation in game seven, Martin Gelinas scored 1:25 into overtime as Calgary won the game 3–2.

(4) Colorado Avalanche vs. (5) Dallas Stars
The Colorado Avalanche entered the playoffs as the fourth seed in the Western Conference with 100 points. Dallas qualified as the fifth seed earning 97 points during the regular season. This was the third playoff meeting between these two teams, with Dallas having won both previous series. They last met in the 2000 Western Conference Final where Dallas won in seven games. Colorado won three of the four games during this year's regular season series.

The Avalanche defeated Dallas in five games. David Aebischer made 37 saves in a 3–1 Colorado victory in game one. The Avalanche scored three times on the power-play in game two winning the game by a score of 5–2. Dallas came back from a two-goal deficit in game three and won the game 4–3 in overtime on a goal by Steve Ott to climb back into the series. Dallas heavily out-shot the Avalanche in game four, but Marek Svatos won the game for Colorado 5:18 into the second overtime. After allowing the first goal in game five Colorado scored five unanswered goals to eliminate the Stars with a 5–1 victory.

Conference Semifinals

Eastern Conference Semifinals

(1) Tampa Bay Lightning vs. (7) Montreal Canadiens

This was the first playoff meeting between these two teams. The teams split this year's four game regular season series.

The Lightning swept the Canadiens in four games. Lightning goaltender Nikolai Khabibulin recorded his fourth shutout of the post-season in a 4–0 game one victory. Vincent Lecavalier scored twice in game two as Tampa Bay won the game by a score of 3–1. Montreal was unable to hang on to a late lead in game three as Vincent Lecavalier tied the game in the final minute of regulation and Brad Richards scored 65 seconds into overtime as the Lightning won 4–3. Brad Richards scored his second game-winning goal of the series in the second period of game four as the Lightning closed out the Canadiens with a 3–1 victory.

(3) Philadelphia Flyers vs. (4) Toronto Maple Leafs

This was the sixth playoff meeting between these two teams with Philadelphia winning four of the five previous series. They last met in the previous year's Eastern Conference Quarterfinals where Philadelphia won in seven games. Philadelphia won three of the four games in this year's regular season series.

The Flyers defeated Toronto in six games. Marcus Ragnarsson broke the tie in the second period of game one as the Flyers eventually won the game 3–1. Philadelphia scored twice with the man advantage in game two as the Flyers held on for a 2–1 victory. Toronto used three second period goals to earn a 4–1 victory in game three. Maple Leafs captain Mats Sundin scored twice in game four as Toronto won 3–1. Keith Primeau recorded a hat trick and added an assist in a dominating 7–2 Flyers victory in game five. Philadelphia goaltender Robert Esche made just one save in the game while earning the victory, he was replaced by Sean Burke at the start of the second period due to injury. Toronto overcame a 2–0 third period deficit to force overtime in game six, however the comeback came up short as Jeremy Roenick scored the series-winning goal at 7:39 of the first overtime period.

Western Conference Semifinals

(1) Detroit Red Wings vs. (6) Calgary Flames

This was the second playoff meeting between these two teams with Detroit winning the only previous series. They last met in the 1978 Preliminary Round where Detroit won in two games against the Atlanta Flames. Detroit won three of the four games during this year's regular season series.

The Flames defeated the Red Wings in six games. Miikka Kiprusoff made 28 saves and Marcus Nilson scored the game-winning goal 2:39 into overtime as the Flames took the opening game of the series 2–1. The Red Wings bounced back with a 5–2 victory in game two led by Steve Yzerman's two goals in the second period. Jiri Fischer tied the game halfway through the second period of game three, however Flames forward Shean Donovan scored just 40 seconds later and put the Flames up for good as Calgary registered a 3–2 victory. Mathieu Dandenault broke the tie in the third period of game four as Detroit bounced back with a 4–2 victory. During the second period of game five a shot by Red Wings defenceman Mathieu Schneider deflected off a stick and struck Red Wings captain Steve Yzerman in the left eye. Yzerman was attended to for several minutes and then helped off the ice holding a towel to his face, Yzerman did not return to the series. Calgary goaltender Miikka Kiprusoff shutout the Red Wings with a 31-save performance in a 1–0 victory. In game six, Miikka Kiprusoff continued his shutout streak against the Red Wings. With just 47 seconds left in the first overtime Flames forward Martin Gelinas scored on Curtis Joseph and Calgary won their second-straight 1–0 game. This was the Flames' second-straight overtime victory to clinch a series in this playoff year.

(2) San Jose Sharks vs. (4) Colorado Avalanche

This was the third playoff meeting between these two teams with Colorado winning both previous series. They last met in the 2002 Western Conference Semifinals where Colorado won in seven games. Colorado won the season series earning five of eight points during this year's four game regular season series.

San Jose defeated Colorado in six games as the Sharks advanced to the Conference Finals for the first time in franchise history. Patrick Marleau scored a hat-trick in a 5–2 Sharks victory in game one. In game two, Marleau scored late in the second period to put the Sharks up for good as they defeated the Avalanche in a 4–1 victory. San Jose goaltender Evgeni Nabokov posted a 33-save shutout in game three and Vincent Damphousse scored the only goal in a 1–0 San Jose victory. Joe Sakic scored the lone goal of the game 5:15 into the first overtime period in game four as Colorado extended the series with a 1–0 victory. For the second consecutive game overtime was required in game five and Joe Sakic scored the game-winning goal 1:54 into the first overtime, giving Colorado a 2–1 victory. With his second goal in game five, Joe Sakic equaled Maurice Richard for the most career playoff overtime goals with six. San Jose scored three times in just over ten minutes in the second period of game six to eliminate the Avalanche in a 3–1 win.

Conference Finals

Eastern Conference Final

(1) Tampa Bay Lightning vs. (3) Philadelphia Flyers

This was the second playoff meeting between these two teams with Philadelphia winning the only previous series. They last met in the 1996 Eastern Conference Quarterfinals where Philadelphia won in six games. Tampa Bay made their first appearance in a Conference Final since entering the league in the 1992–93 season, while the Flyers last made it to the Conference Finals in 2000, losing in seven games to the New Jersey Devils. Tampa Bay won all four games in this year's regular season series.

Tampa Bay won their first conference championship defeating the Flyers in seven games. Lightning goaltender Nikolai Khabibulin made 19 saves in a 3–1 Lightning win in game one. The Flyers scored the first six goals in game two as they won easily 6–2. Tampa Bay jumped out to an early two-goal lead in game three and eventually won by a score of 4–1. Keith Primeau scored the game-winning goal shorthanded in game four as the Flyers claimed a 3–2 victory that tied the series. The Lightning scored three times on the power-play in game five as won the game 4–2. The Flyers tied the game in the dying minutes of game six on a goal by Keith Primeau that forced overtime. Simon Gagne scored at 18:18 of the first overtime period as the Flyers gained a 5–4 victory. Fredrik Modin gave the Lightning a two-goal lead in game seven and they hung on to win the game 2–1.

Western Conference Final

(2) San Jose Sharks vs. (6) Calgary Flames

This was the second playoff meeting between these two teams with San Jose winning the only previous series. They last met in the 1995 Western Conference Quarterfinals where San Jose won in seven games. San Jose made their first appearance in a Conference Final since entering the league in the 1991–92 season, while the Flames last made it to the Conference Finals in 1989, defeating the Chicago Blackhawks in five games. The teams split this year's four game regular season series.

The Flames eliminated the Sharks in six games and they became the first Canadian team to qualify for the Stanley Cup Finals in a decade. Calgary goaltender Miikka Kiprusoff made 49 saves and Steve Montador won game one for the Flames with a goal at 18:43 of the first overtime period, giving them a 4–3 victory. In game two Calgary scored two first-period goals and never looked back in a 4–1 victory. Sharks goaltender Evgeni Nabokov posted a 34 save shutout and Alex Korolyuk scored two goals late in third period in a 3–0 win in game three. The Sharks exploded for four goals in the second period of game four as they evened the series at two games apiece with a 4–2 victory. Miikka Kiprusoff shutout the Sharks in game five as the Flames won 3–0. Martin Gelinas scored his third consecutive series-winning goal for the Flames in game six giving Calgary a 3–1 victory.

Stanley Cup Finals

This was the first playoff series between these two teams. Tampa Bay made their first Finals appearance, in their twelfth season, while Calgary made their third Finals appearance. The Flames won their last appearance in the Finals defeating Montreal in six games in 1989. Tampa Bay won the only game of this year's regular season series.

Player statistics

Skaters
These are the top ten skaters based on points, following the conclusion of games played on June 7.
GP = Games played; G = Goals; A = Assists; Pts = Points; +/– = Plus/minus; PIM = Penalty minutes

Goaltending
These are the top five goaltenders based on either goals against average or save percentage with at least four games played.

GP = Games played; W = Wins; L = Losses; SA = Shots against; GA = Goals against; GAA = Goals against average; TOI = Time On Ice (minutes:seconds); Sv% = Save percentage; SO = Shutouts

See also
2003–04 NHL season
List of NHL seasons

References

playoffs
Stanley Cup playoffs